The Ithu were an indigenous Australian people of the eastern coast of the Cape York Peninsula, northern Queensland.

Country
The Ithu's territory, including Noble Island, the adjacent reefs, and islands, such as Howick within the Howick island group opposite Barrow Point.

People
Very little has survived regarding the Ithu, and  Norman Tindale suggested that they might possibly have been a horde of the Mutumui.

Alternative name
 Wurkuldi.

Notes

Citations

Sources

Aboriginal peoples of Queensland